John Bason (born 24 April 1957) is a British businessman.

Early life
John Bason was born on 24 April 1957 in Knutsford, Cheshire, England. He graduated from Trinity College, Cambridge, where he earned an MA in natural sciences.

Career
Bason began his career by joining the graduate training scheme at British Airways.

Bason has served as Finance director of Bunzl. Since May 2009, he has served as Finance Director of Associated British Foods, which owns Primark, British Sugar, Twinings, etc. He also sits on the board of directors of the Compass Group since 21 June 2011. He is a member of the Institute of Chartered Accountants in England and Wales.

He serves on the board of trustees of Voluntary Service Overseas and is deputy chairman of FareShare.

References

Living people
1957 births
People from Knutsford
Alumni of Trinity College, Cambridge
English businesspeople
Associated British Foods people